The Joukowsky Institute for Archaeology and the Ancient World is an interdisciplinary center at Brown University focused on research and teaching of archaeology, with an emphasis on the archaeology and art of the ancient Mediterranean, Egypt, and the Near East. Brown's undergraduate and graduate programs in archeology are organized through the institute.

History
The Joukowsky Institute was established in 2004, with an eight–figure gift from Artemis Joukowsky and Martha Sharp Joukowsky. Artemis had previously served as the university's Chancellor while Martha was Professor emerita of Old World Archaeology and Art.

The Institute continued and expanded the activities of Brown’s former Center for Old World Archaeology and Art (COWAA), which Sharp Joukowsky directed until her retirement in 2004. COWAA was founded in 1978 by R. Ross Holloway, professor of classics and Rudolf Winkes, historian of ancient Roman art. Martha Sharp Joukowsky joined the faculty soon after its establishment and expanded the center's scope to include the Middle East.

In 2006, Susan E. Alcock began as the institute's inaugural director Peter van Dommelen succeeded Alcock, becoming Director of the Institute in July 2015.

The institute began in 70 Waterman St, a facility renovated for use with funding from the Joukowskys in 1981. Beginning in 2006, Rhode Island Hall, on Brown's Main Green was extensively renovated for use by the institute. Lead by Anmahian Winton Architects, the renovation cost a total of $12 million; the building opened in September of 2009.

The Joukowsky Institute holds its own collection of several thousand archeological objects, independent from the Haffenreffer Museum of Anthropology. Among these items are a numismatic collection and materials excavated by Brown archeologists at Petra in Jordan. In November and December 2020, during the Covid-19 pandemic, the Institute held a series of online lectures themed around epidemics and pandemics in Antiquity.

Core faculty
Peter van Dommelen is director of the institute, having succeeded inaugural director Susan E. Alcock (2006–15) in 2015. Other notable faculty include James P. Allen, John F. Cherry, Yannis Hamilakis, Johanna Hanink, Susan Ashbrook Harvey, and Stephen D. Houston.

Current fieldwork
 Archaeology of College Hill, Providence, RI (2006–)
 Brown University Abydos Project, Egypt
 Brown University Labraunda Project, Turkey
 Brown University Petra Terraces Archaeological Project, Jordan
 Koutroulou Magoula Archaeology and Archaeological Ethnography Project, Greece
 MonArch: Wesleyan-Brown Monastic Archaeology Project, Soissons, France (1982–)
 Notion Archaeological Survey, Turkey
 Proyecto Paisaje Piedras Negras-Yaxchilan, Guatemala
 The S'Urachi Project: Cultural Encounters and Everyday Life around a Nuraghe in Classical and Hellenistic Times, Sardinia, Italy
 Survey and Landscape Archaeology on Montserrat, West Indies
 Uronarti Regional Archaeology Project, Sudan

Publications
The Joukowsky Institute's publication series, Joukowsky Institute Publications (JIP), operates under the general editorship of Professor John F. Cherry. The first book in the series (JIP I) was published by Oxbow Books in December 2009. The series succeeds “Archaeologia Transatlantica,” published by the Center for Old World Archaeology and Art between 1981 and 2004.

See also
Outline of archaeology
Petra
Graduate Group in the Art and Archaeology of the Mediterranean World at the University of Pennsylvania

References

External links
 Joukowsky Institute for Archaeology and the Ancient World
 The endangered future of the past by Christopher Witmore and Omur Harmansah, The New York Times, December 21, 2007
 Thinking of Graduate School in Classical Archaeology?, prepared by Jennifer Gates-Foster and Tim Moore, Department of Classics, The University of Texas at Austin

Brown University
Research institutes in Rhode Island
Archaeological research institutes